John Michael Stimack (May 25, 1922 – October 29, 2006) was an American football coach.  He was the seventh head football coach at Adams State College—now known as Adams State University—in Alamosa, Colorado, serving for five seasons, from 1952 to 1956, and compiling a record at of 15–29–1.

References

External links
 

1922 births
2006 deaths
Adams State Grizzlies football coaches
People from Cañon City, Colorado